A habit is a routine of behavior that is repeated regularly and tends to occur subconsciously.

Habit or Habits may also refer to:

Apparel
 Religious habit, a distinctive dress worn by the members of a religious order
 Riding habit, women's clothing for horseback riding
 Keffiyeh, a traditional Arab headdress, sometimes called a habit
 Sudarium, worn by Jewish men after wedding.

Art, entertainment, and media

Film 
 Habit (1921 film), an American silent film
 Habit (1997 film), an American horror film
 Habit (2021 film), an American drama film

Music
 Habit (album), by U;Nee, 2007
 Habits (album), by Neon Trees, 2010
 "Habit" (Pearl Jam song), 1996
 "Habit" (Sekai no Owari song), 2022
 "Habit" (Tulisa Contostavlos song), 2012
 "Habit", a 2012 song by Adler from Back from the Dead
 "Habits (Stay High)", a 2013 song by Tove Lo
 "Habits", a 1960s song by The Wailing Wailers with Junior Braithwaite

Science and technology
HABIT (HabitAbility: Brine, Irradiation and Temperature), an instrument designed to harvest water from the Mars atmosphere
 Habit (biology), aspects of behaviour or structure
 Crystal habit, the characteristic external shape of an individual crystal 
 Drug habit, drug addiction

Other uses
 Habit, Kentucky, a place in the United States
 Habit evidence, a term used in the law of evidence

See also

 Bad Habits (disambiguation)
 Habitus (disambiguation)
 Habitat, the type of natural environment in which a particular species of organism lives
 Habituation, a form of non-associative learning
 Habitica, formerly HabitRPG, an online task management application
 Addiction